The River Char is a river in Dorset. The Char runs a few miles from Bettiscombe to Charmouth, passing Pilsdon and Whitchurch Canonicorum.

Rivers of Dorset